Simcoe County District School Board (SCDSB, known as English-language Public District School Board No. 17 and Simcoe County Board Of Education prior to 1999) is an Ontario, Canada, English speaking public school board, serving Simcoe County. The schools and learning centres are branched throughout 4,800 square kilometres in Simcoe County. This Central Ontario setting is bordered by the Holland Marsh in the south, the Trent-Severn Waterway in the east, Grey County in the west and Muskoka in the north.

Staff and students
The SCDSB currently has over 50,000 students in 87 elementary schools, 14 secondary schools, 9 alternative secondary schools and 6 adult learning centres. The SCDSB also employs over 6,000 employees.

Budget
The SCDSB is funded by the Ministry of Education for the Province of Ontario. Funding for the year ending August 2012 totals some $508,762,274. This is broken down by 18 major funding lines including Pupil Foundation Grant (252.5 M), School Foundation Grant (34.4 M), Special Education Grant (66.7 M), Language Grant (6.5 M), FNMI Grant (1.2 M), Learning Opportunities Grant (4.0 M), Safe School Supplement (0.9 M), Program Enhancement Grant (1.0 M), Continuing Education Grant (2.6 M), Cost Adjustment/ Teacher Qualifications (38.8 M), Student Transportation Grant (18.8 M), Declining Enrolment Adjustment (2.6 M), School Board Administration and Governance (13.1 M), School Operations Allocation (44.7 M), School Renewal Allocation (6.7), Interest Expense (11.8 M), Non-Permanently Financed Capital Debt (2.0 M). These amounts are further broken down by the Ministry of Education, many with restrictions on their use, and others that are locally managed. Funding for the 2012-13 school year is projected to be approximately 2.4 million dollars less than 2011-12, due to the province's focus on containing costs in order to address a 16 billion dollar deficit. Unlike all other levels of government, school boards are not allowed to maintain any long term operational deficits.

High school rankings
Secondary school Fraser Institute provincial rankings as of 2019, and enrollments as of 2022 are as follows:.

Former secondary schools

Barrie Central Collegiate Institute, founded in 1843, closed in 2016.

Park Street Collegiate, closed in 2015.

Orillia District Collegiate Vocational Institute, closed in 2015.

Penetanguishene Secondary School, opened in 1966, closed in 2016.

Schools

See also
Simcoe Muskoka Catholic District School Board
List of school districts in Ontario
List of high schools in Ontario

References

External links
 Simcoe County District School Board website

School districts in Ontario
Education in Simcoe County
Non-profit organizations based in Barrie